Forum Horsens is an indoor sports arena and music venue in Horsens, Denmark. It seats 4,000 spectators for sports events, and for concerts there can be 4,500 sitting or 5,000 standing. It is adjacent to the larger Forum Horsens Arena stadium.

External links 
 The arena's homepage 

Indoor arenas in Denmark
Sports venues in Denmark
Buildings and structures in Horsens Municipality
Horsens